The Monocar was a French automobile manufactured in Paris from 1936 until 1939.  It was a small single-seater three-wheeler, and was powered by a 173 cc two-stroke engine.

References
 David Burgess Wise, The New Illustrated Encyclopedia of Automobiles.

Defunct motor vehicle manufacturers of France